In mathematics, the Prüfer manifold or Prüfer surface is a 2-dimensional Hausdorff real analytic manifold that is not paracompact.

Construction

The Prüfer manifold can be constructed as follows . Take an uncountable number of copies Xa of the plane, one for each real number a, and take a copy H of the upper half plane (of pairs (x, y) with y > 0). Then glue the open upper half of each plane Xa to the upper half plane H by identifying (x,y)∈Xa for y > 0 with the point  in H. The resulting quotient space Q is the Prüfer manifold. The images in Q of the points (0,0) of the spaces Xa under identification form an uncountable discrete subset.

See also
Long line (topology)

References

Topological spaces
Surfaces